Richard Alan Zimmer (born August 16, 1944) is an American Republican Party politician from New Jersey, who served in both houses of the New Jersey Legislature and in the United States House of Representatives. He was the Republican nominee for the U.S. Senate from New Jersey in 1996 and 2008. In March 2010, he was appointed by Governor Chris Christie to head the New Jersey Privatization Task Force.

Early life and career
Zimmer was born on August 16, 1944 in Newark, New Jersey to William and Evelyn Zimmer, the second of two children. In his early years he was raised in Hillside, New Jersey. His father, a physician, died of a heart attack when he was 3 years old. After his father's death, his mother moved from Hillside to Bloomfield, New Jersey, where she supported the family by working as a clerk at the Sunshine Biscuits warehouse. They lived in a Bloomfield garden apartment, which Zimmer has referred to as "the New Jersey equivalent of a log cabin."

When Zimmer was 12 years old, his mother married Howard Rubin, a Korean War veteran with three children of his own. The newly combined family moved to Glen Ridge, New Jersey, and Rubin worked at the post office there. Zimmer attended Glen Ridge High School, where he was selected as the class speaker for his graduation ceremony. His mother, suffering from lymphoma, required paramedics to take her from Columbia Presbyterian Hospital to the school auditorium on a stretcher to hear the address. She died several days later.

Zimmer attended Yale University on a full academic scholarship and majored in political science, graduating in 1966. In the summer of 1965, he worked in the Washington, D.C. office of Republican U.S. Senator Clifford P. Case, after which time he became active in Republican politics.
He attended Yale Law School, where he was an editor of the Yale Law Journal.

Career 
After receiving his LL.B. in 1969 he worked as an attorney in New York and New Jersey for several years, first for Cravath, Swaine & Moore and then for Johnson & Johnson.

In 1973, he was elected to the Common Cause National Governing Board, a nonpartisan, nonprofit advocacy group and think tank with the mission to make political institutions more open and accountable. From 1974 to 1977, he served as chairman of New Jersey Common Cause. As chairman he successfully lobbied for New Jersey's Sunshine Law, which made government meetings open to the public. He also championed campaign finance reform, working closely with Thomas H. Kean, then a member of the New Jersey General Assembly. Zimmer then served as treasurer for Kean's reelection campaign.

New Jersey Legislature

After moving to Delaware Township in Hunterdon County, he was elected to the General Assembly in 1981, serving until 1987. He was the prime Assembly sponsor of New Jersey's first farmland preservation law, resulting in the permanent preservation of 1,222 farms in the state. Zimmer also sponsored the legislation creating the state's radon detection and remediation program, which became a national model. He was chairman of the Assembly State Government Committee from 1986 to 1987.

In 1987, following the death of State Senator Walter E. Foran, Zimmer won a special election to replace him in the New Jersey Senate. He was later elected to a full term. In the Senate he served on the Revenue, Finance and Appropriations Committee.

U.S. House of Representatives

In 1990, Zimmer ran for the United States House of Representatives for the 12th District, then encompassing parts of Hunterdon, Mercer, Somerset, Morris and Warren counties. The seat was open after six-term incumbent Jim Courter decided to not seek reelection after unsuccessfully running for Governor of New Jersey the previous year. In the Republican primary, Zimmer defeated Assemblyman Rodney Frelinghuysen, the early favorite, and Phil McConkey, former wide receiver for the New York Giants. In the general election he defeated Marguerite Chandler, a businesswoman from Somerset County, by a margin of 66 to 34 percent.

Zimmer served three terms in the House, winning reelection in 1992 and 1994. As a Congressman, Zimmer is best known for writing Megan's Law (U.S. Public Law 104–145), which requires notification when a convicted sex offender moves into a residential area. It was named after Megan Kanka, a New Jersey resident who was raped and murdered by convicted sex offender Jesse Timmendequas. He also introduced "no-frills" prison legislation, requiring the elimination of luxurious prison conditions.

As a member of the Ways and Means Committee, he sought the elimination of wasteful spending and undue taxation. He was ranked the most fiscally conservative member of the United States Congress three times by the National Taxpayers Union and was designated a Taxpayer Hero by Citizens Against Government Waste every year he was in office.

Zimmer was also a member of the Committee on Science, Space and Technology and the Committee on Government Operations. As a member of the Environment Subcommittee, he introduced environmental risk-assessment legislation later incorporated in the 1996 amendments to the Safe Drinking Water Act.

1996 U.S. Senate campaign

In 1995, Zimmer lined up support to run in the following year's United States Senate elections, becoming the front-runner among Republicans seeking to face Democratic incumbent Bill Bradley. On August 16, 1995, Bradley announced that he would not seek reelection. Zimmer formally announced his candidacy on February 13, 1996, having already secured the endorsement of Governor Christine Todd Whitman and other leading Republicans. In the Republican primary he won with 68 percent of the vote, defeating Passaic County Freeholder Richard DuHaime (20 percent) and State Senator Dick LaRossa (12 percent).

After a bitter and expensive campaign that focused partly on Zimmer's authorship of the federal version of Megan's Law, Zimmer lost to Democratic Congressman Robert Torricelli by a vote of 1,519,328 (53 percent) to 1,227,817 (43 percent).

Career after Congress
Zimmer gave up his House seat to run for the Senate, completing his third term in office on January 3, 1997. After leaving Congress, he worked at the Princeton office of the Philadelphia-based law firm Dechert Price & Rhoads. In 2001 he joined the Washington, D.C. office of Gibson, Dunn & Crutcher, where he is of counsel.

From 1997 to 2000 Zimmer also taught as a lecturer in Public and International Affairs at Princeton University's Woodrow Wilson School.

In 2000, Zimmer again ran for the 12th District House seat. In the Republican primary he defeated Michael J. Pappas, who had held the seat from 1997 to 1999, by a margin of 62 to 38 percent. He faced the incumbent, Democrat Rush D. Holt, Jr., in the general election. The results were too close to call on election night, and after a recount Zimmer ultimately lost by only 651 votes (146,162 to 145,511 votes, or 48.7 to 48.5 percent).

On March 11, 2010, Zimmer was appointed by Governor Chris Christie to be the chairman of the New Jersey Privatization Task Force, charged with developing plans to privatize certain state government operations as a cost-cutting measure.

On September 25, 2020, he endorsed Joe Biden for President.

In February 2021, Zimmer announced he was running for the New Jersey Senate. However, he dropped out later that month.

Zimmer and his wife Marfy Goodspeed are longtime residents of Delaware Township in Hunterdon County, New Jersey. They have two sons: Carl Zimmer, a science writer, and Benjamin Zimmer, a linguist and lexicographer.

2008 U.S. Senate campaign

Zimmer entered the race for the Republican nomination for the U.S. Senate from New Jersey on April 11, 2008, after being drafted by New Jersey Republican leaders. Party leaders had originally supported businesswoman Anne Evans Estabrook for the Senate nomination until she withdrew in March 2008, following a mini-stroke. Many Estabrook supporters then supported businessman Andy Unanue for the Senate nomination. Unanue received criticism in the race because of his residency in New York City and his spending his entire three-week campaign in Vail, Colorado. Several days after filing his petitions for the Senate race, Unanue dropped out of the race and his committee on vacancies designated Zimmer to enter the race under the Unanue petitions.

On June 3, 2008, Zimmer won the Republican U.S. Senate nomination over State Senator Joseph Pennacchio and Ramapo College economics professor Murray Sabrin. In the general election on November 4, 2008 he faced the Democratic primary winner, incumbent U.S. Sen. Frank Lautenberg.

In polls conducted by Rasmussen Reports and Strategic Vision in mid-September 2008, Zimmer trailed Lautenberg by 7 points. He ultimately lost to Lautenberg by a margin of 56 percent to 43 percent. Despite the loss, Zimmer received nearly 1.4 million votes, setting a record for most votes cast in New Jersey history for a Republican candidate for statewide office.

See also
 List of Jewish members of the United States Congress

References

External links
 
 
 Biographical information for Dick Zimmer from The Political Graveyard
 Biography on Senate campaign website (archived)

|-

|-

|-

|-

|-

1944 births
Cravath, Swaine & Moore people
Glen Ridge High School alumni
Jewish members of the United States House of Representatives
Lawyers from Newark, New Jersey
Living people
Republican Party members of the New Jersey General Assembly
New Jersey lawyers
Republican Party New Jersey state senators
New York (state) lawyers
People associated with Gibson Dunn
People from Bloomfield, New Jersey
People from Delaware Township, Hunterdon County, New Jersey
People from Glen Ridge, New Jersey
Politicians from Hunterdon County, New Jersey
Politicians from Newark, New Jersey
Republican Party members of the United States House of Representatives from New Jersey
Yale Law School alumni
21st-century American Jews
Members of Congress who became lobbyists